The Bluebird railcars were a class of self-propelled diesel-hydraulic railcar built by the South Australian Railways' Islington Railway Workshops between 1954 and 1959.

History

The Bluebird railcars were built to provide modern air-conditioned services on the country passenger rail system where the patronage did not warrant the use of locomotive hauled passenger trains, and to replace the ageing fleet of Brill railcars introduced in 1924.

In December 1948, tenders were called for 30 sets of engines, gearboxes, electrical assemblies and compressors. The contract for the engines was awarded to Cummins while the contract for the eight-speed gearboxes was awarded to Cotal of France. All of the engines had been received by May 1952, but problems with the gearboxes meant the first did not arrive until January 1954. Cotal subsequently ceased trading in April 1954 with only six gearboxes having been delivered, so an alternative source was found.

Twenty-one Bluebirds were manufactured by the South Australian Railways' Islington Railway Workshops. The fleet consisted of 11 second-class passenger power cars (250 class), three baggage power cars (280 class) and seven first-class passenger trailer cars (100 class). They were first introduced in October 1954; the last unit entered service on 12 November 1959. Their excellent ride, quietness and airconditioning set a new standard in Australian railcars.

The 100 and 250 class were named after birds; the unnamed 280 class baggage cars only carried road numbers. They operated services on the broad-gauge network from Adelaide to Burra, Gladstone, Moonta, Morgan, Mount Gambier, Nuriootpa, South Australia, Port Pirie, Tailem Bend, Terowie (extended to Peterborough in 1970) and Victor Harbor.

Each Bluebird was powered initially by a pair of Cummins NHHS-600 engines, which were replaced between 1959 and 1965 by Cummins NHHRS engines and again by Cummins NT 855 engines between 1975 and 1977.  Auxiliary power was provided by a General Motors 3-71 engine, later replaced by a Deutz unit. In 1971–72, cars 101, 105, 106, 250-253 and 257-259 were fitted with buffet facilities.

In March 1978, all Bluebirds were included in the transfer of the assets of South Australian Railways to Australian National. In 1986, a new computer system required the class leaders to be renumbered as the last member of the class: hence 100 became 107, 250 became 261 and 280 became 283.

By 1985, ten Bluebirds had been fitted with standard-gauge bogies for use on services to Port Pirie, Whyalla and Broken Hill. One was fitted with 20 poker machines, operating tours to Broken Hill from April 1988 to February 1993.

In 1989, shortly before all South Australian country passenger services were withdrawn, the 100 class trailers began to be used as sitting carriages on the Indian Pacific and The Overland.<ref>"Loco Hauled Cars" Railway Digest" May 1990 page 191</ref> Some were also converted for use as crew carriages on Trans-Australian Railway services.Bluebird Railcar Driving Trailers 100 to 107 Chris' Commonwealth Railways Pages The last were withdrawn in January 1993 and placed in store at Mile End and later Islington Railway Workshops. In May 1995, no. 257 was donated to the National Railway Museum, Port Adelaide."Kestral returns to operation" Railway Digest May 2013 pages 52-53

In 1997, 15 of the railcars were sold to Bluebird Rail Operations, a business of C.O.C. Limited. In May 1998 Bluebird Rail Operations commenced operating the Barossa Wine Train'' from Adelaide to Tanunda via the Barossa Valley line with three refurbished Bluebirds (102, 251 and 252). The venture ceased in April 2003, after which the railcars were stored at the National Railway Museum, Port Adelaide.

In 1998, another four (106, 107, 254 and 255) were refurbished and hired to V/Line for Gippsland line services from Melbourne to Warragul and Traralgon. Following mechanical failures while being trialled on the Gippsland line, the railcars were returned in June 1999. One was sold to the Northern Rivers Railroad for use on its Murwillumbah line charter train.

In 2003, four returned to Victoria for a proposed service from Melbourne to Mildura, which did not materialise.

Disposition

The following table shows the disposition of Bluebird railcars in 2012. To expand it, click [] in the header cell titled "Notes".

References

External links

Railcars of South Australia